The American College of History & Legal Studies (ACHLS) was a completion college in Salem, New Hampshire, United States, which operated from 2010 to 2015.

Administrators at the Massachusetts School of Law in Andover, Massachusetts were inspired to start the college due to concerns about students entering the law school with poor writing skills and American history knowledge. The goal was for the undergraduate college to serve as a feeder school for the law school. It received state accreditation by a unanimous vote of the New Hampshire Senate.

Billed as a "fast track to law school," ACHLS offered students transferring in from other institutions a program that combined the final two years of their B.A. with a J.D. Articulation agreements were signed with nearby New Hampshire Technical Institute and Mount Wachusett Community College to help students transfer to ACHLS. After finishing their junior year at ACHLS, students could begin their first year at the Massachusetts School of Law.

Designed to be low cost, the college's tuition was $10,000 USD for the 2010-2011 academic year, and was eliminated in 2011 for students who completed their junior year and enrolled early at the law school at regular cost. Students who chose not to enroll at the law school were billed for their senior year at ACHLS.

The college closed after graduating three small classes. Its alumni include at least one elected official.

References

Defunct private universities and colleges in New Hampshire
Universities and colleges in Rockingham County, New Hampshire
Educational institutions established in 2010
Educational institutions disestablished in 2015
2010 establishments in New Hampshire
2015 disestablishments in New Hampshire